is a city located in the eastern part of Saga Prefecture on the island of Kyushu, Japan. As of February 28, 2017, the city has an estimated population of 72,755 and a population density of 1,000 persons per km2. The total area is 71.73 km2.

Overview
Tosu is one of the major transportation hubs of Kyushu. Its main train station is Tosu Station which connects the Nagasaki Main Line and the Kagoshima Main Line. There is also a junction connecting the Kyūshū Expressway, Nagasaki Expressway and Ōita Expressway. Economically it is part of the Fukuoka metropolitan area, and according to a 2000 census about 5% of the total population of Tosu commute to work or school in Fukuoka.

Geography
Located in the Saga Plains, the Chikushi River runs along the southern border of Tosu. The lowlands are used for paddy farming and are where the city center is located. The northwestern part of the city contains the eastern part of the Sefuri Mountaians.

Mountains
 Mount Kusenbu (848 m)
 Mount Ishidani (754 m)
 Shiroyama (501 m)

Rivers
 Akimitsu River
 Ara River
 Chikugo River
 Daigi River
 Hōman River
 Yamashita River

Dams
 Kawachi Dam

Adjoining municipalities
Saga Prefecture
Kiyama
Miyaki
Fukuoka Prefecture
Chikushino
Kurume
Nakagawa
Ogōri

History
1874 - Saga Rebellion. A battle between the government troops and the rebel army occurred on Mount Asahi.
1889-04-01 - The modern municipal system iwas established. At this time Tosu consists of five separate villages: (Asahi, Fumoto, Kizato, Tashiro and Todoroki).
1907-03-19 - Todoroki was elevated town status and was renamed Tosu.
1936-03-11 - Tashiro was elevated to town status.
1954-04-01 - Tosu Town absorbed Tashiro Town and Asahi, Fumoto and Kizato Villages to create Tosu City.

Education

Junior colleges
 Kyushu Ryukoku Junior College

Senior high schools
 Tosu Senior High School
 Tosu Technical High School
 Tosu Commercial High School

Junior high schools
 Kounan Junior High School
 Tosu Junior High School
 Tosu Nishi Junior High School
 Tashiro Junior High School
 Kizato Junior High School

Elementary schools
 Tosu Elementary School
 Tosu Kita Elementary School
 Tashiro Elementary School
 Kizato Elementary School
 Fumoto Elementary School
 Asahi Elementary School
 Wakaba Elementary School

Transport

Rail

The main station is Tosu Station. The Kyushu Shinkansen stops at Shin-Tosu Station.
Kyushu Shinkansen
Shin-Tosu Station
Kagoshima Main Line
Yayoigaoka Station - Tashiro Station - Tosu Station - Hizen-Asahi Station
Nagasaki Main Line
Tosu Station - Shin-Tosu Station - Hizen-Fumoto Station

Road
Expressways
Kyushu Expressway: Tosu Junction and Tosu Interchange
Nagasaki Expressway: Tosu Junction and Tosu Interchange
Ōita Expressway: Tosu Junction
National highways
Route 3
Route 34
Route 500
Prefectural roads:
Tosu-Asakura Route 14
Kurume-Kiyama-Chikushino Route 17
Saga-Kawakubo-Tosu Route 31

Scenic and historic places
Chikushi family Katsuo Castle ruins
Mount Asahi castle ruins
Best Amenity Stadium

Sightseeing spots
Azumaya
Kawachi Dam area
Torigoe and Yamabiko mountain retreats
Shimin no mori
Kawachi swimming pool
Mount Asahi Park
Mount Kusenbu
Kyushu Nature Walk
Nakatomi Commemorative Medicine Museum
Ochōzu waterfall
Numakawa swimming pool
Saga racecourse
Tashiro Park
Tosu Premium Outlets

Festivals and events
Tosu Yayoi Matsuri (last Sunday of March)
Hana no hi (May 4)
Tori no hi (Sunday between May 10 and May 16)
Matsuri Tosu (last Sunday of July)
Tosu Yamakasa (first Saturday and Sunday of summer vacation)
Doyō Yoichi (Saturday night market, end of July)

Sports
Sagan Tosu - in J. League football
Hisamitsu Springs - in V. League volleyball
Yuka Kobayashi - in Girls Keirin keirin

Notable people from Tosu
Koichi Ogata - pro baseball player
Masayoshi Son - businessman, founder of SoftBank

References

External links 

 

Cities in Saga Prefecture